The Imperial Valley lettuce strike of 1930 was a strike of workers against lettuce growers of California's Imperial Valley

Beginning on January 1, 1930 Mexican and Filipino workers walked off their jobs at lettuce farms throughout the valley. Complaining of low wages and abysmal working conditions, they vowed to strike until their demands were met. However, almost exactly three weeks later the strike was called off. This was due mostly to the power of the growers within the Imperial Valley along with divisions within the organizations leading the strikers. This strike was also notable due principally that the workers were migrant workers from Mexico working on American farms and that there was a considerable Communist influence in the latter part of the strike which showed an openness of the American agricultural worker to Communist propaganda and leadership.

Background 
Beginning in 1928, agricultural workers in California began to unionize. The Imperial Valley Workers Union was formed in April 1928. Shortly after its founding, the union changed its name to the Mexican Mutual Aid Society. The union was founded mainly due to the discontent of the agricultural workers employed on farms in California's Imperial Valley. Their main grievances were against labor contractors who failed to pay them their full wages and even occasionally would withhold a week's pay. This led to the union calling on the Mexican consul Carlos Ariza to settle the conflict with the employers. Ariza prompted the union officials to form a society which could work on the issue of getting their members their fair wages and begin to redress and resolve the wage claims. Within a month of incorporation, the union signed up twelve hundred members, opened office in four Imperial Valley towns, and delivered its first petition to the growers via the Chamber of Commerce asking for a wage increase for cantaloupe workers. The Mexican Mutual Aid Society would be the main driving force behind the Lettuce Strike and would lead the strike for the early portion in an attempt to obtain better working conditions and better pay for its Mexican members.

The strike begins 
On January 1, 1930 the Imperial Valley Lettuce Strike began. Multitudes of Mexican and Filipino lettuce pickers walked off the job protesting declining wages and horrible working conditions. Roughly 5,000 workers would spontaneously walk off their jobs and go on strike. The Mexican Mutual Aid Society saw this opportunity to push for the improvement of working conditions and pay for its members and readily sought to lead the strike against the growers in the Valley. The Society pushed initially for a peaceful solution to the strike, seeking to negotiate with growers in an attempt to increase the wages and working conditions of the Mexican and Filipino workers under their employ. However, the growers declined to negotiate with the Agency and the strike started to lose steam.

Communist support arrives 
With the strike faltering following the decline of the proposal by the Mexican Mutual Aid Society by the Imperial Valley growers, the Communist labor organizations in the area saw an opportunity to unite the workers of the Valley into a single organization dominated by communist ideals. When the lettuce strike was brought to the attention of the Communist labor organizers in the region, they hurriedly moved in to exploit the unrest amongst the Californian labor force. The organization sent three representatives to the region to help lead the strike and give it new momentum. The names of these men were Frank Waldron, Harry Harvey, and Tsuji Horiuchi. These three men quickly took over strike leadership from the floundering Aid Society and created a new union called the Communist Trade Union Unity League (TUUL). This league would be the leading organization for the rest of the strike. With the TUUL at the helm, the strikers developed a list of demands that the growers would have to meet if the lettuce pickers were to return to work. These demands were a fifty cent hourly wage, guarantee of minimum four hours pay, eight-hour work day with time and a half for overtime, and no discrimination based upon gender or race amongst other complaints.

The strike fails 
Although the Communist TUUL gave the Lettuce Strike new life, the reinvigoration of the strike would be short lived. The Mexican Mutual Aid Society, being jealous of the Communist takeover of leadership of the strike began to aid the growers. The Society did this by withholding support for the strike and threatening Mexican workers on strike with deportation along with giving them promises of "free land" if they went willingly back to Mexico. However, these promises were empty and no "free land" was to be given to the Mexican workers who took the Society up on their offer. As a result, rifts began to appear within the strikers and internal support for their cause began to wane. The last nail in the coffin came when law enforcement began to raid striking worker's meeting places. On January 21, AWIL organizers, who were supporting the strike, were arrested and thrown in jail to be brutally interrogated. Other raids ensued on the following days, and as a result on January 23 the strike is called off.

Results of the strike 
The strike ended after only three weeks of protests by the lettuce pickers. None of their demands were met and they were forced to go back to work in horrible conditions or risk deportation by the Aid Society who had turned against them in the strike. For the Communist TUUL the strike was a blow to their influence in the region. If the strike had succeeded, communist influence would have spread throughout the Imperial Valley and perhaps have unified the workers into a solid group with Communist ideals. However, with the failure of the strike and the imprisonment of many of the League's key leaders, the strike would cripple the influence of Communist efforts in the region for two years, and they wouldn't try to lead another strike until 1933.

References 

Labor disputes in California
1930 in California
Agriculture in California
1930 labor disputes and strikes
Imperial County, California
Agriculture and forestry labor disputes in the United States